The 2017 Southland Conference baseball tournament was held from May 24 through 27.

Seeding and format
The top eight finishers from the regular season, not including Abilene Christian or Incarnate Word, were seeded one through eight. They played a two bracket, double-elimination tournament, with the winner of each bracket meeting in a single championship final.

Results

All-Tournament Team
The following players were named to the All-Tournament Team.

Most Valuable Player
Robie Rojas was named Tournament Most valuable Player.  Rojas was a catcher for Sam Houston State.

References

Tournament
Southland Conference Baseball Tournament
Southland Conference baseball tournament
Southland Conference baseball tournament